Venkatraman Ramnarayan (born 8 November 1947, in Madras) is a former Indian first-class cricketer and current journalist, editor, translator and teacher.

Cricket career
An off-spin bowler, Ramnarayan left his native Tamil Nadu and moved to Hyderabad in 1971 to see if he could break into first-class cricket. In the final of the Moin-ud-Dowlah Gold Cup Tournament in October 1975 he took 8 for 75 in the first innings for Hyderabad Cricket Association XI, who went on to win the match. A week later he made his first-class debut for Hyderabad against Kerala in the Ranji Trophy, taking 6 for 33 in the first innings. A further week later, in the first innings against Andhra, he took 6 for 41. In the quarter-final against Bombay he took 7 for 68 in the first innings, but Bombay won the match after trailing on the first innings, and went on to win the championship.

With 28 wickets at an average of 17.32, 1975-76 was Ramnarayan's most successful season, but he continued to play for Hyderabad in the Ranji Trophy until 1979-80. He also played for South Zone in the Duleep Trophy in 1978-79 and in 1980-81 when, in his last first-class match, he took 4 for 144 off 51 overs in the first innings.

Journalism career
Ramnarayan is a regular columnist for Cricinfo, the editor of Sruti, a monthly performing arts magazine, and a teacher at the Asian College of Journalism, Chennai. He has also translated books from Tamil into English.

In 2015 he published a memoir of his first-class cricket career, Third Man: Recollections from a Life in Cricket. He writes under the name "V. Ramnarayan".

Books by V. Ramnarayan
 Mosquitos and Other Jolly Rovers: The Story of Tamil Nadu Cricket (2002)
 R.K. Swamy, His Life and Times: From Humble Village Origins to the Top Rungs of a Contemporary Profession (2007)
 Third Man: Recollections from a Life in Cricket (2015)

References

External links
 
 
 V. Ramnarayan's articles for Cricinfo
 "Whatever happened to sportsmanship?" by V. Ramnarayan
 
 

1947 births
Living people
Cricketers from Chennai
Indian cricketers
Hyderabad cricketers
South Zone cricketers
Savitribai Phule Pune University alumni
Cricket historians and writers
Indian magazine editors
Indian cricket commentators
Journalists from Tamil Nadu
Indian sportswriters
20th-century Indian biographers